Edmund Edmondson (13 August 1920 – 21 October 1982) was president of the United States Chess Federation from 1963 to 1966 and executive director of the United States Chess Federation from 1966 to 1975. He served as an officer in the United States Air Force, reaching the rank of lieutenant colonel.

Edmondson played a key role in Bobby Fischer's path to the World Chess Champion in 1972. He asked Pal Benko, who had qualified for the 1970 Interzonal, to yield his spot to Fischer. 
Benko realized that Fischer had a much greater chance of winning and agreed, receiving a fee of $2,000. Edmondson is also credited with greatly expanding the USCF. 

Edmondson served as Fischer's manager during the 1970 Interzonal, and during his winning 1971 Candidates' matches against Mark Taimanov, Bent Larsen, and Tigran Petrosian.

Edmundson was born in Rochester, New York, and died in Honolulu.

References

External links

1920 births
1982 deaths
American chess players
Chess officials
Sportspeople from Rochester, New York
20th-century chess players